Finland competed at the 2017 World Championships in Athletics in London, United Kingdom, from 4 to 13 August 2017, and failed to win any medals. In the IAAF 1st to 8th placings table, they placed 54th with one fifth place.

Results

Men
Track and road events

Field events

Women
Track and road events

Field events

References

Nations at the 2017 World Championships in Athletics
World Championships in Athletics
2017